Simon Says (Spanish: Simón dice) is a Mexican sitcom that premiered on Las Estrellas on 24 July 2018. The series is created and produced by Pedro Ortiz de Pinedo for Televisa. The series stars Arath de la Torre, Nora Salinas, Ricardo Fastlicht, Dalilah Polanco, Sergio Ochoa, Claudia Acosta, Carlos Speitzer, and María Chacón.

The series revolves around a group of unhappily married friends that meet every week to tell stories of furtive conquests and fictitious work achievements. Production of the series began in April 2018. The series has been renewed for a second season, filming began on 12 March 2019. The second season premiered on 30 July 2019.

Plot 
Simón (Arath de la Torre), Bartolomé (Sergio Ochoa) and César (Ricardo Fastlicht), are three unhappily married men with dominant women. Every Thursday they meet in a male sanctuary, where they to play cards and tell stories of furtive conquests and work achievements that never happened. Daniel (Carlos Speitzer), newly married, has joined the group and the other members consider him a good candidate to mold the perfect male. Their wives also meet to tell what really happens in their couple's lives, where they are the ones in control.

Cast 
 Arath de la Torre as Simón
 Nora Salinas as Diana
 Ricardo Fastlicht as César
 Dalilah Polanco as Beatriz
 Sergio Ochoa as Bartolomé
 Claudia Acosta as Carla
 Carlos Speitzer as Daniel
 María Chacón as Nicole

Episodes

Series overview

Season 1 (2018)

Season 2 (2019) 

Notes

Awards and nominations

References

External links 
 

Las Estrellas original programming
Mexican television sitcoms
2018 Mexican television series debuts
Television series by Televisa
Spanish-language television shows
2019 Mexican television series endings